Keithy Simpson (born 19 April 1990, in Kingston) is a Jamaican professional footballer.

Career

Youth and Amateur

Simpson attended Donald Quarrie High School and Hydel High School in Jamaica and played club soccer for Sporting Central Academy before joining the youth academy of Canadian team Vancouver Whitecaps joining Jamaica youth national teammate Dever Orgill. He featured in matches against the youth academies of Eintracht Frankfurt and Leicester City at the XXIX Dallas Cup, and played in the USL Premier Development League with the Vancouver Whitecaps Residency team in 2009. He also traveled to Germany with the club and competed against the U-19 team of Hertha Berlin and others.

Senior

After featuring for Sporting Central Academy most of his career, Simpson move to Portmore United in January 2011. He spent 18 months with North East Stars FC of the TT Pro League from September 2012. In March 2014, Simpson signed with Vaasan Palloseura in Finland. In 2016, Simpson signed with Águila in El Salvador.

In September 2020, Simpson signed with Dunbeholden FC in the Jamaican top flight.

International
Simpson was a member of the Jamaica under-17 squad during the 2017 CONCACAF U-17 Championship qualifiers 2007 in Kingston, Jamaica and 2009 CONCACAF U-20 World Cup qualifiers in Scarborough, Tobago.

In August 2011, Simpson played in the CFU Olympic qualifiers in Suriname for Jamaica. On 30 May 2014, he made his debut for the Jamaica senior team against Switzerland, as a second-half substitute in Lucerne.

He was called up to play against Egypt on 4 June, and France on 8 June, but was unable to travel with the team due to club commitments.

On 9 September 2014 he earned his second cap in a 3–1 away defeat to Canada.

References

External links
 

1990 births
Living people
Expatriate soccer players in Canada
Association football forwards
Jamaican expatriate footballers
Jamaican expatriate sportspeople in Canada
Jamaican footballers
Jamaica under-20 international footballers
Vancouver Whitecaps Residency players
USL League Two players
TT Pro League players
Expatriate footballers in Trinidad and Tobago
North East Stars F.C. players
Jamaica international footballers
Sporting Central Academy players
2009 CONCACAF U-20 Championship players
Veikkausliiga players
Vaasan Palloseura players
Expatriate footballers in Finland
Dunbeholden F.C. players